The women's 50 metre freestyle event at the 2010 Asian Games took place on 16 November 2010 at Guangzhou Aoti Aquatics Centre.

There were 26 competitors from 18 countries who took part in this event. Four heats were held, with two containing the maximum number of swimmers (eight). The heat in which a swimmer competed did not formally matter for advancement, as the swimmers with the top eight times from the entire field qualified for the finals.

Li Zhesi and Tang Yi from China won the gold and silver medal respectively, Japanese swimmer Yayoi Matsumoto won the bronze medal.

Schedule
All times are China Standard Time (UTC+08:00)

Records

Results 
Legend
DSQ — Disqualified

Heats

Final

References
 16th Asian Games Results

External links 
 Women's 50m Freestyle Heats Official Website
 Women's 50m Freestyle Ev.No.23 Final Official Website

Swimming at the 2010 Asian Games